The Taiwan Number One Party was a minor political party in Taiwan.

See also
 List of political parties in the Republic of China

References

Political parties in Taiwan